Francis Kyeremeh (born 23 June 1997) is a Ghanaian football forward who plays for Bosnian Premier League club Sarajevo.

Career

Jagodina
As a member of Ghana U20 national team, Kyeremeh arrived to Jagodina in summer 2015, from Brong Ahafo Stars, where he scored several goals for the 2015 season. After he passed the trial period, Jagodina decided to sign him. He scored a goal on his SuperLiga debut, against OFK Beograd on 13 September 2015. Kyeremeh also scored a goal against Metalac Gornji Milanovac during the first-half season. During the winter break off-season, Francis played with team a friendly match in his home country against Asante Kotoko. For the spring half-season, Francis also scored 1 goal in the first play-out match, against Novi Pazar. For the season, he made 23 league and 3 cup appearances. He also played several matches for youth selection before the end of season, helping team to survive in the Serbian youth league.

Radnik Surdulica
After a season he spent with Jagodina, Kyeremeh moved to Radnik Surdulica in 2016. He spent summer with team, playing several friendly matches during the pre-season and later signed a three-year contract with club. He made his official debut for new team in the 4 fixture of the 2016–17 Serbian SuperLiga season, against Rad.

Hapoel Tel Aviv
On 31 July 2019, Kyeremeh signed the Israeli Premier League club Hapoel Tel Aviv.
In December 2019, Kyeremeh released from the club.

Career statistics

References

External links
 Francis Kyeremeh stats at utakmica.rs 
 

1997 births
Living people
People from Brong-Ahafo Region
Association football forwards
Ghanaian footballers
Ghanaian expatriate footballers
BA Stars F.C. players
FK Jagodina players
Hapoel Tel Aviv F.C. players
FK Radnik Surdulica players
FK Žalgiris players
FK Sarajevo players
Ghana Premier League players
Serbian SuperLiga players
Israeli Premier League players
Premier League of Bosnia and Herzegovina players
Ghanaian expatriate sportspeople in Serbia
Ghanaian expatriate sportspeople in Israel
Ghanaian expatriate sportspeople in Lithuania
Ghanaian expatriate sportspeople in Bosnia and Herzegovina
Expatriate footballers in Serbia
Expatriate footballers in Israel
Expatriate footballers in Lithuania
Expatriate footballers in Bosnia and Herzegovina